The Ports is the second of the two debut solo EPs by American rapper and record producer J57. Preceded by 2057, The Ports was released in memory of Bryan "Ports" Coyle, a friend who J57 said was instrumental in his journey into music.

Track listing

Release history

References

2012 EPs
J57 EPs